The University of Macau (UM; Portuguese: Universidade de Macau, Chinese: 澳門大學) is an internationalised public comprehensive university in Macau. The UM campus is located in the east of Hengqin Island, Guangdong province in Mainland China, on a piece of land leased to the Macau SAR government, and is under the jurisdiction of Macau.

UM is ranked in the 201–250 bracket in the Times Higher Education (THE) World University Rankings 2022, with a global ranking of No. 5 in International Outlook, No. 33 in the THE Asia University Rankings, No 60 in the THE Asia-Pacific University Rankings, and No 26 in the THE Young University Rankings. In the Quacquarelli Symonds (QS) World University Rankings 2023, it is ranked No. 304. The university ranks first in the Portuguese-speaking world.

With the approval of the Ministry of Science and Technology of China, UM has established three state key laboratories, namely State Key Laboratory of Analog and Mixed-Signal VLSI, State Key Laboratory of Quality Research in Chinese Medicine, and State Key Laboratory of Internet of Things for Smart City.

The Faculty of Business Administration of the University of Macau becomes the 99th in the world and the first triple-accredited business school in Macau to be accredited by the European Quality Improvement System (EQUIS), the Association of Accredited Business Schools International (AACSB) and the Association of Master of Business Administration (AMBA) in 2020.

History 
The predecessor of the University of Macau (UM) is the University of East Asia (UEA), a private university founded in March 1981. In the beginning, the majority of the students came from Hong Kong. In 1988, the Portuguese Macao government acquired UEA through the Macao Foundation and renamed it the University of Macau in 1991. It was located in Taipa.

In 1999, the sovereignty over Macao was returned to China. With the mission of nurturing professionals much needed by the transitional period accomplished, UM entered a new era. The new Judicial Regime of the University of Macau and the new Charter of the University of Macau were officially passed at the Legislative Assembly of the Macau SAR and came into effect in September 2006.

In 2009, the National People's Congress Standing Committee of China officially adopted a decision that authorised the Macao SAR to exercise jurisdiction over the new UM campus located on Hengqin Island, Guangdong province. On 20 December 2009, then Chinese President and General Secretary of the Communist Party Hu Jintao officiated at the groundbreaking ceremony for the new campus. In early 2013 the Macau Legislative Assembly passed Law 3/2013 providing for the application of Macau Law in the campus effective on opening day. On 5 November, then Vice-Premier of the State Council Wang Yang officiated at the new campus inauguration ceremony. In the 2014/2015 academic year, UM began to conduct all classes on the new and modern campus.

In 2016, the university established a residential college system similar to that of Oxbridge.

Mission 
UM undertakes as its prime mission the advancement of scholarship and education in the realms of humanities, social sciences, business, law, natural sciences, engineering, health sciences, education and other areas.
 	 
 Providing higher education in accordance with the University Motto (Humanity, Integrity, Propriety, Wisdom and Sincerity).
 Promoting academic research and disseminating knowledge.
 Advancing culture, science and technology and promoting Macau's growth.
 Cultivating responsible citizens and leaders of high calibre who possess the sound moral judgment and independent thinking ability necessary to meet the needs of the development of Macau and the region.

Identification

Emblem 
The emblem of the University of Macau (UM) features a five-towered crest encircled by golden rings and the name of the university in Chinese and Portuguese.

Logo 
The logo of the UM consists of two parts: the emblem and the university's name in Chinese (澳門大學), Portuguese (Universidade de Macau) and English (University of Macau) with assigned colours.

Motto 
Humanity, Integrity, Propriety, Wisdom, Sincerity.

Reputation and rankings 

UM is ranked #201–250 in 2022 Times Higher Education World University Rankings, No 33. in the THE Asia University Rankings,  No. 60 in the THE Asia-Pacific University Rankings and No. 26 in the THE Young University Rankings. It is ranked #304 in 2023 QS World University Rankings.

In the QS World University Rankings by Subject, UM’s rankings are as follows: 201-250 in Linguistics, 251-300 in Education and Training, 301-320 in English Language and Literature, 301-340 in Law and Legal Studies, 351-400 in Engineering – Electrical and Electronic, 401-450 in Mathematics, 451-500 in Computer Science and Information Systems, and 501-550 in Medicine.

In the THE World University Rankings by subject, UM’s rankings are as follows: 101-125 in Engineering and Technology; 126-150 in Education, and Life Sciences; 151-175 in Computer Science, and Psychology; 176-200 in Law; 201-250 in Arts & Humanities; 251-300 in Clinical & Health, Social Sciences, and Physical Sciences; and 301-400 in Business & Economics.

In the Essential Sciences Indicators (ESI) rankings, it is among the top 1 per cent in ten subjects, namely Engineering, Computer Science, Materials Science, Chemistry, Pharmacology & Toxicology, Psychiatry/Psychology, Clinical Medicine, Biology & Biochemistry, Social Sciences, General, and Agricultural Sciences.

In 2022 THE posted an article stating that some ex-employees and current employees of the university reported that the university is now hiring nationals of China to replace non-Chinese nationals, and one non-Chinese lecturer stated that the "dominant working language" has become Chinese despite the official status of English.

Academic organisations 

The university has seven faculties in the fields of Arts and Humanities, Business Administration, Education, Health Sciences, Law, Science and Technology, and Social Sciences. The university also administrates Honors College, Graduate School, and the Centre for Continuing Education. Research institutes include the Institute of Advanced Studies in Humanities and Social Sciences, the Institute of Applied Physics and Materials Engineering, the Institute of Chinese Medical Sciences, Institute of Collaborative Innovation, and Institute of Microelectronics, Asia-Pacific Academy of Economics and Management, and Centre for Macau Studies. They offer postgraduate and undergraduate programmes with more than 700 academic staff members involved in teaching and research. Many subjects are also taught in English.

The Academic Staff Association of the University of Macau (in Portuguese: Associação dos Professores da Universidade de Macau, in Chinese: 澳門大學教師協會) is an association composed of full-time academic staff members of the University of Macau.

Faculty of Arts and Humanities 
The Faculty of Arts and Humanities (FAH) comprises the Department of Chinese Language and Literature, the Department of English, the Department of Portuguese, the Centre for Japanese Studies, the English Language Centre, the English Writing and Communication Centre, and it hosts programmes in Translation Studies, Philosophy and Religious Studies, French, Spanish, German, and Korean.

The faculty has various facilities devoted to student development, including Language Labs where students practice simultaneous translation and machine-aided translation or perfect their skills in Portuguese, Spanish, German, Japanese, or French. A black box theatre hosts various drama productions within the faculty.

The Department of Portuguese Studies used to be the Institute of Portuguese Studies but was downgraded during the 1999 handover due to the anticipation that interest would decline. In 2001 UM began offering a bachelor's degree programme for Portuguese students. Enrollment grew from nine students in 2001 to about 240 students in 2011. In 2011 the Portuguese department had eight part-time employees and 30 permanent employees, with about three-quarters of the permanent ones having PhDs. Michael Taylor of the South China Morning Post wrote that year that the downgrading of the Portuguese department was perceived as a mistake in retrospect.

Faculty of Business Administration 
The Faculty of Business Administration is the largest faculty in the university. The medium of instruction for courses offered in the faculty is English. It offers several business programmes through its four departments: the Department of Accounting and Information Management, the Department of Finance and Business Economics, the Department of Management and Marketing, and the Department of Integrated Resort and Tourism Management. The faculty is AACSB and AMBA accredited.

Faculty of Education 
The Faculty of Education offers bachelor's, master's and doctoral programmes. The faculty provides degree programmes of Secondary Education in Chinese, English and Mathematics, Primary Education and Pre-Primary Education, Educational Administration, Educational Psychology, School Counselling, Curriculum and Instruction, Physical Education and Sports Studies, etc.

Faculty of Health Sciences 
The Faculty of Health Sciences (FHS) has thrived since its establishment in 2013. FHS now offers two undergraduate programmes, one master programme and one PhD programme. The research of FHS focuses on eight major themes: (i) cancer research, (ii) cancer precision medicine (iii) stem cell and development (iv) ageing, neural and metabolism disorders, (v) drug development, (vi) data science, (vii) bioimaging and (vii) structural biology. To support these research activities, FHS has established a state-of-the-art infrastructure that includes 35 research laboratories, four research centres and four core facilities.

Faculty of Law 
The Faculty of Law offers bachelor's, master's, doctoral and postgraduate certificate programmes in the Chinese, Portuguese and English languages. The bachelor's programmes are to prepare jurists who are familiar with Macau SAR legal system; the master's and doctoral programmes purport to educate knowledgeable and qualified legal professional jurists who are competent to conduct theoretical research and teaching in Macau Law, Comparative Law, European Law, International Law, and International Business Law. The teaching system of the faculty generally follows the Roman-German regime with strict standards in teaching style, student recruitment, and examination. The faculty members consist of legal experts from Macau, Mainland China, Portugal, Austria, Italy, Brazil, Belgium, India, and other countries.

Classes in law are taught in Portuguese since Macau's legal code is in Portuguese.

Faculty of Science and Technology 
The Faculty of Science and Technology was founded in 1989. Four-year undergraduate degree programmes in the following departments have been developed: the Department of Civil and Environmental Engineering, the Department of Computer and Information Science, the Department of Electrical and Computer Engineering, the Department of Electromechanical Engineering, the Institute of Applied Physics and Materials Engineering, and the Department of Mathematics. Increasing numbers of students have been accepted in big firms worldwide, adding to the rising recognition of the University of Macau.

Graduate degree programmes in the faculty have been developed since 1993, in the fields of Civil Engineering, Computer Science & Information Engineering, E-Commerce, Electrical and Computer Engineering, Electromechanical Engineering, and Mathematics.

There are various kinds of enriched laboratories for teaching and research purposes in various science and engineering fields.

Faculty of Social Sciences 
The Faculty of Social Sciences consists of the Department of Communication, the Department of Economics, the Department of Government and Public Administration, the Department of Psychology, and the Department of Sociology. The faculty provides a number of courses every semester, including Economics, Statistics, Econometrics, Political Science, Public Administration, Contemporary China Studies, Sociology, Communications, Journalism and Public Communication, Psychology, and Historical and Cultural Relations between the East and the West. The faculty also offers a variety of master's and doctoral programmes. They also have a Russian Centre.

Honours College 
The Honours College selectively recruits high-calibre undergraduates to nurture them into future leaders. They have access to the best research activities at UM and can study abroad at a world-renowned university to gain an international perspective on their disciplines.

Graduate school 
Professor Wei Ge is the interim Dean of the Graduate School.

Institute of Chinese Medical Sciences 
The Institute of Chinese Medical Sciences (ICMS) was established as the first research-oriented institute in Macau in 2002.

ICMS offers the PhD degree programme in Biomedical Sciences, and Master of Science degree programmes in Chinese Medicinal Science and Medicinal Administration, respectively.

Institute of Applied Physics and Materials Engineering 
IAPME offers a PhD programme in Applied Physics and Materials Engineering.

Institute of Microelectronics 
IME offers programmes in the area of microelectronics.

Institute of Collaborative Innovation 
ICI encourages multidisciplinary academic cooperation within universities. Currently, it hosts the Centre for Cognitive and Brain Sciences, the Centre for Artificial Intelligence, the Centre for Data Science and the Centre for Innovation and Entrepreneurship.

Center for Macau Studies

Asia-Pacific Academy of Economics and Management

Departments and programmes

Residential colleges 
UM is the only university in Macao to implement a residential college system. There are currently ten RCs at UM, namely Chao Kuang Piu College, Cheng Yu Tung College, Cheong Kun Lun College, Choi Kai Yau College, Henry Fok Pearl Jubilee College, Lui Che Woo College, Ma Man Kei and Lo Pak Sam College, Moon Chun Memorial College, Shiu Pong College, and Stanley Ho East Asia College. As a complement to the faculty-based system, the RCs serve as a vehicle for whole-person education through systematic planning of experiential programmes. RCs aim to nurture students into compassionate and socially responsible individuals with the ability for self-reflection amid a culturally diverse and intellectually stimulating environment, with the aim of nurturing students who are successful in their studies and of high moral character. The RCs strive to enhance students’ seven competencies: civic responsibility, global competitiveness, knowledge integration, teamwork, service and leadership, cultural engagement, and healthy living.

Campus 
The UM campus is separated from Taipa by a river, with the Hengqin Hill serving as a backdrop with trees. It covers 1.09 km2, with an area of 820,000m2 and more than 60 buildings. Faculty students and Macau residents can enter and exit the campus through an underwater tunnel.

The campus was designed by He Jingtang, an architect and member of the Chinese Academy of Engineering.

The campus is divided into four parts – east, south, west and north. The library, Central Teaching Building, facilities and Student Activity Centre are in the east. The Postgraduate Houses and Staff Quarters are in the south. The residential colleges are in the west, while the research buildings, Administration Building, sports facilities and University Hall are in the north.

Due to the COVID-19 pandemic, the campus was closed at the start of 2020. The university has security guards checking people's temperatures at entrances, and people must show their health certificates on their phones.  They also must show proof of vaccination and/or nucleic acid-free.

Notable alumni 

 Cheong Weng Chon
 Francisco D'Souza
 Hean Tat Keh (BBA Hons 1989), Professor of Marketing at Monash University.

See also 
 Education in Macau
 List of universities and colleges in Macau
 St. Paul's College, Macau

Notes

References

Further reading

External links 

 University of Macau

 
Taipa
Universities in Macau
Educational institutions established in 1981
1981 establishments in Macau